Timothy George Golden (born November 15, 1959) is an American former college and professional football player who was a linebacker in the National Football League (NFL) for four seasons during the mid-1980s.  Golden played college football for the University of Florida, and thereafter, he played professionally for the New England Patriots and Philadelphia Eagles of the NFL.

Early years 

Golden was born in the small town of Pahokee, Florida.  He attended Boyd H. Anderson High School in Lauderdale Lakes, Florida, and played high school football for the Boyd Anderson Cobras.

College career 

Golden accepted an athletic scholarship to attend the University of Florida in Gainesville, Florida, where he played defensive end for coach Doug Dickey and coach Charley Pell's Florida Gators football teams from 1978 to 1980.  As a junior in 1979, he lived through the worst season in the history of the Florida football program, when the Gators posted an 0–10–1 record.  The following season, Golden was part of the biggest one-year turn-around in Division I football history, when the 1980 Gators finished 8–4 after defeating the Maryland Terrapins in the Tangerine Bowl.  He was a second-team All-Southeastern Conference (SEC) selection and an honorable mention All-American in 1980.

Golden graduated from the University of Florida with a bachelor's degree in broadcasting in 1981.

Professional career 

See also 

 Florida Gators football, 1970–79
 Florida Gators football, 1980–89
 List of Florida Gators in the NFL Draft
 List of New England Patriots players
 List of Philadelphia Eagles players
 List of University of Florida alumni

References

Bibliography 

 Carlson, Norm, University of Florida Football Vault: The History of the Florida Gators, Whitman Publishing, LLC, Atlanta, Georgia (2007).  .
 Golenbock, Peter, Go Gators!  An Oral History of Florida's Pursuit of Gridiron Glory, Legends Publishing, LLC, St. Petersburg, Florida (2002).  .
 Hairston, Jack, Tales from the Gator Swamp: A Collection of the Greatest Gator Stories Ever Told, Sports Publishing, LLC, Champaign, Illinois (2002).  .
 McCarthy, Kevin M.,  Fightin' Gators: A History of University of Florida Football, Arcadia Publishing, Mount Pleasant, South Carolina (2000).  .
 McEwen, Tom, The Gators: A Story of Florida Football, The Strode Publishers, Huntsville, Alabama (1974).  .
 Nash, Noel, ed., The Gainesville Sun Presents The Greatest Moments in Florida Gators Football, Sports Publishing, Inc., Champaign, Illinois (1998).  .

1959 births
Living people
People from Pahokee, Florida
Sportspeople from the Miami metropolitan area
Players of American football from Florida
American football linebackers
Florida Gators football players
New England Patriots players
Philadelphia Eagles players